Maxim Osipov may refer to:

Maxim Osipov (writer), born 1963, Russian writer and cardiologist
Maxim Osipov (ice hockey, born 1980), Russian professional ice hockey player 
Maxim Osipov (ice hockey, born 1993), Russian professional ice hockey player